Thomas Peacock (1837 – 18 February 1922) was a 19th-century Member of Parliament in Auckland, New Zealand.

He represented the Auckland North electorate from 1881 to 1884, then Newton from 1884 to 1887, then Ponsonby from 1887 to 1890, when he retired.

In 1884, Peacock defeated Cecil de Lautour by 732 to 608 votes.

References

|-

1837 births
1922 deaths
Members of the New Zealand House of Representatives
Mayors of Auckland
Burials at Symonds Street Cemetery
New Zealand MPs for Auckland electorates
19th-century New Zealand politicians